The 2017 Open de Limoges was a professional tennis tournament played on indoor hard courts. It was the 11th edition of the tournament and part of the 2017 WTA 125K series, offering a total of $115,000 in prize money. It took place in Limoges, France, on 6–12 November 2017.

Singles main draw entrants

Seeds 

 1 Rankings as of 30 October 2017.

Other entrants 
The following players received a wildcard into the singles main draw:
  Alizé Cornet
  Olga Danilović
  Sabine Lisicki
  Chloé Paquet
  Jessika Ponchet

The following players received entry from the qualifying draw:
  Manon Arcangioli 
  Elena-Gabriela Ruse 
  Olga Sáez Larra
  Daniela Seguel

The following player received entry as a lucky loser:
  Andrea Gámiz

Withdrawals 
Before the tournament
  Polona Hercog (back/neck injury) →replaced by  Andrea Gámiz

Doubles entrants

Seeds 

 1 Rankings as of 30 October 2017.

Other entrants 
The following pair received a wildcard into the doubles main draw:
  Chloé Paquet  /  Pauline Parmentier

Champions

Singles

  Monica Niculescu def.  Antonia Lottner, 6–4, 6–2

Doubles

  Valeria Savinykh /  Maryna Zanevska def.  Chloé Paquet /  Pauline Parmentier, 6–0, 6–2

External links 
 Official website 

2017 WTA 125K series
2017 in French tennis
Open de Limoges